Marilyn Wood (1929-2016) was an American choreographer, intermedia artist, and dancer. She created contemporary, city-scale intermedia performances known as "Celebrations". Marilyn Wood's Celebration Events is recognized for bringing communities together to celebrate their vitality and diversity in a unique experience of spectacle and participation in urban environments. Her work is recognized as helping reinvent the spirit and drama of the ancient festival in contemporary life.

Early years
Wood was born in Columbus, Ohio in 1929. Her father's career took the family to Puerto Rico, where she spent her childhood years, taking drawing classes, performing in a small flamenco company, playing guitar, and singing South American folk songs. This experience had a seminal influence on her future career.

Returning to Washington, D.C. for her last two years of high school, Wood studied painting at the Corcoran Gallery and then attended Oberlin College, graduating in 1950. While at Oberlin College, Wood met and married musician Robert Wood. She was soon drawn to the program of Moholy-Nagy's Bauhaus Institute of Design in Chicago and its pioneering approaches to the visual arts, architecture, and design. While experimenting with the dimensionality of sculpture combined with student dance classes in improvised movement, she had an epiphany: "I discovered I could BE the sculpture!" This led to two summer sessions with Hanya Holm at Colorado College and further solidified her shift from painting to dance.

Career

Merce Cunningham Dance Company
In New York City, her professional apprenticeship began with the Alwin Nikolais Company at the Henry Street Playhouse (1951-1957). This was followed by five years performing in the early Merce Cunningham Dance Company (1958-1963) and touring with John Cage, Robert Rauschenberg, Merce Cunningham, and five other dancers: Carolyn Brown, Viola Farber, Remy Charlip, Judith Dunn and Steve Paxton. They toured in a VW bus with John Cage as music director and driver and Robert Rauschenberg as set, lighting, and costume designer. Wood danced in several notable pieces, including "Summerspace," "Rune," "Antic Meet," and "Crises".

The Celebration Group
In 1968, inspired by her exposure to the environmental theatre of Anna Halprin, she stepped off the proscenium forever and formed Marilyn Wood and the Celebration Group. This group of 8-12 dancers, visual artists, filmmakers, architects, and musicians experimented with site-specific performance in many NYC venues. The genesis of her Celebration vision was a combination of her experience in the avant-garde art world as a dancer, and her history of living in a Latin culture.

Celebrations in City Places: The Seagram Building
In 1972, Marilyn Wood and the Celebration Group became the launch pad for Wood to conceive, choreograph, direct, and produce her "Celebrations in City Places" series. The most ambitious of these was a site-specific performance at the Seagram Building on Park Avenue, New York City. Her choreography of this event activated the forty-four stories of the façade, the lobby, and the plaza featuring thirty-five dancers inside and outside, original music, film projection, and audience participation in the grand finale.

The outstanding success of the Seagram project garnered her honorary membership in the American Institute of Architects (AIA) and launched her international career, generating commissions for numerous US cities (Charlotte, North Carolina, Kansas City, Missouri, Columbus, Ohio, Little Rock, Arkansas, Tulsa, Oklahoma, and Denver, Colorado) and international cities (Berlin, Germany, Singapore, Tehran, Iran, Hong Kong, Rio de Janeiro, Brazil, and Adelaide, Australia).

Selected events
 1997 El Paso, Texas/Juarez, Mexico: Rio Grande/Bravo Cross-Border Celebration. Performance honoring the shared river, connecting on the International Bridge
 1992 Charlotte, North Carolina: Nationsbank Corporate Center Grand Opening Celebration. Daylight fireworks, fountain dances, rapeller choreography, atrium aerial ballet, evening roof-edge and scaffold dances, 6 story mega-images of "Faces of Charlotte", and a 300-voice cantata and drumming for nighttime fireworks
 1974 New York City: "Rain ‘n' Shine Events for Flowertime"; Lincoln Center Plaza
 1972 New York City: "Celebrations in City Places"; Seagram Building and Plaza

Celebrations choreography
Wood's process often began with use of environmental scores to involve the creativity of the local community of participating artists into initial ideas of the site design. This process was highlighted in "Citysenses," a show that ran for three weeks in 1969 at the Museum of Contemporary Crafts in New York City. Her resulting choreography typically encapsulated all aspects of the site with a focus on the physical access of a large audience, often from many directions. The piece orchestrates local performing groups simultaneously at all entry points as the audience's arrival experience. The choreography includes dance sequences on rooftops, windows, fountains, plazas, parks, and waterfronts. There is also original music, soundscapes, fire and sky sculpture, inflatable forms, site-generated films and video, daytime and nighttime fireworks. The design of the event features deliberate choreographic gestures to move the attention of the audience to one aspect of the site to another. The transition into the finale initiates the audience into dancing and sharing energy in the street.

Later years
In 1987, Wood moved to Santa Fe, New Mexico and founded the International Center for Celebration (ICC), an international network of artists whose innovative forms embraced the spirit, scale, and energy of the environmental and cultural venues of each project. The ICC received many grants from the National Endowment for the Arts, including a Creative Artist Fellowship to Japan and a grant from the New York State Council on the Arts. In 2013, Wood received a Lifetime Achievement Award from the American Dance Guild. She gave keynote speeches at international conferences and participated in residencies and workshops around the world.

Death 
Marilyn Wood died on June 16, 2016.

References

Books
 Steel, Anthony. "Painful in Daily Doses : An Anecdotal Memoir" 145  Wakefield Press (2009)
 

Journals
 Paxton, Steve. "Reflections While Reviewing ‘Merce Cunningham Fifty Years.'" Dance Research: The Journal of the Society for Dance Research, Vol. 17, No. 2 (Winter, 1999): 3-8 Edinburgh University Press.
 Potter, Michelle. "A License to Do Anything: Robert Rauschenberg and the Merce Cunningham Dance Company." Dance Chronicle, Vol. 16, No. 1 (1993): 1-43. Taylor & Francis, Ltd.
 
Articles
 Butler, Chris. "Happenings to liven our Festival." The Advertiser Adelaide, Australia 26 Feb. 1975.
 DeAngelis, Mary Elizabeth. "Artists gear up for tower opening: Hundreds rehearse parts in NationsBank's Saturday gala." Charlotte Observer 22 Oct. 1992.
 Duncan, Kathy. "Marilyn Wood & the Celebrations Group." SOHO Weekly News 11 April. 1974.
 Ganaden, Abishe. "Celebrations: Of a city and its people." The Straits Times Singapore. 8 Dec. 1982.
 Hicks, Graham. "A City in Celebration." The Edmonton Sun 11 July 1983.
 Thoresen, Robert A. "Artistic celebrations on a grand scale: Marilyn Wood lifts festivals to new heights." Portsmouth Herald 8 Nov. 1992: Community Column.

External links
 Interview with Marilyn Wood at the WNYC Archives
Marilyn Wood papers, 1950s-2016, held by the Dance Division, New York Public Library for the Performing Arts.

American choreographers
Site-specific theatre
1929 births
2016 deaths